Matthew Bishop is The Economist U.S. Business Editor and New York Bureau Chief, and a sought after expert on philanthropy. Previously, he was the London-based business editor.

Early life and education
Bishop was educated at Jesus College, Oxford, and was on the faculty at the London Business School. He was an adviser to the United Nations International Year of Microcredit in 2005.

Bibliography
Bishop wrote The Economist guides "The Pocket Economist" and "Essential Economics", passages from which were plagiarised in Saif al-Islam Gaddafi's PhD thesis, in a scandal at the London School of Economics.

He is the also co-author of several books with Michael Green, including: 
"The Road from Ruin: How to Renew Capitalism and Put America Back on Top",
"Philanthrocapitalism: How Giving Can Save the World", and the e-book
"In Gold We Trust".

References

External links
Profile at The Economist
International Year of Microcredit

Year of birth missing (living people)
Living people
The Economist people